Qaleh-ye Barudab (also Romanized as Qal‘eh-ye Bārūdāb; also known as Qai‘eh-ye Dārāb, Qal‘eh-ye Bārūt Āb, and Qal‘eh-ye Dārāb) is a village in Shaban Rural District, in the Central District of Nahavand County, Hamadan Province, Iran. At the 2006 census, its population was 47, in 14 families.

References 

Populated places in Nahavand County